Asherville is an unincorporated community in Mitchell County, Kansas, United States.  As of the 2020 census, the population of the community and nearby areas was 19.

History
The first settlement at Asherville was made in 1866 at the Asher Creek, from which the community takes its name. By 1910, Asherville had about 125 inhabitants.

Asherville had the oldest post office in Mitchell County. It opened in 1869, and remained in operation until it was discontinued in 1980.

Demographics

For statistical purposes, the United States Census Bureau has defined Asherville as a census-designated place (CDP).

Education
The community is served by Beloit USD 273 public school district.

References

Further reading

External links
 Mitchell County maps: Current, Historic, KDOT

Census-designated places in Mitchell County, Kansas
Census-designated places in Kansas